"Sticks and Stones" is a children's rhyme.

Sticks and Stones may also refer to:

Film and television
 Sticks & Stones, a 1996 film featuring Gary Busey
 Sticks and Stones: An Exploration of the Blair Witch Legend, a 1999 short film
 Sticks & Stones (2019 film), a stand-up comedy show by Dave Chappelle
 Sticks and Stones (TV series), a 2019 British drama series
 "Sticks and Stones" (Murder, She Wrote), a television episode
 "Sticks and Stones" (My Name Is Earl), a television episode

Literature
 Sticks and Stones, a 2004 graphic novel by Peter Kuper
 Sticks and Stones, a 2005 novel by Catherine MacPhail
 Sticks and Stones, a 1976 novel by Susan Price
 Sticks and Stones, a 1975 play by James Reaney

Music
 Sticks and Stones (band), a Scottish folk rock band

Albums
 Sticks and Stones (The 77s album), 1990
 Sticks and Stones (Cher Lloyd album), 2011
 Sticks and Stones (Dave Grusin album) or the title song, 1988
 Sticks and Stones (Moe album) or the title song, 2008
 Sticks and Stones (New Found Glory album), 2002
 Sticks and Stones (Tracy Lawrence album) or the title song (see below), 1991
 Sticks 'n' Stones (EP) or the title song, by Jamie T, 2009

Songs
 "Sticks & Stones" (Arlissa song), 2013
 "Sticks and Stones" (Nicola Roberts song), 2011
 "Sticks and Stones" (Titus Turner song), 1959
 "Sticks and Stones" (Tracy Lawrence song), 1991
 "Sticks and Stones", by Alien Ant Farm from Anthology, 2001
 "Sticks and Stones", by Aly & AJ from Into the Rush, 2005
 "Sticks and Stones", by Babyshambles from Down in Albion, 2005
 "Sticks and Stones", by Bronze Radio Return from Shake! Shake! Shake!, 2011
 "Sticks & Stones", by the Divine Comedy from Absent Friends, 2004
 "Sticks and Stones", by Jónsi from the How to Train Your Dragon soundtrack, 2010
 "Sticks 'n' Stones", by Karine Polwart from Traces, 2012
 "Sticks & Stones", by KSI from Jump Around, 2016

Other uses
 Sticks & Stones (board game), a 1978 board wargame by Metagaming Concepts
 Stars and bars (combinatorics), or sticks and stones, a method in combinatorial mathematics

See also
 Sticks and Stones and Broken Bones, a 1991 album by the Toll